Mavis Grind ( or , meaning "gate of the narrow isthmus") is a narrow isthmus joining the Northmavine peninsula to the rest of the island of Shetland Mainland in the Shetland Islands, Scotland.

It is said to be the only place in the UK where you can toss a stone across land from the North Sea to the Atlantic Ocean. It is a regular crossing point for otters, which in Shetland are sea-dwelling. In 1999, local volunteers successfully helped to demonstrate whether Viking ships could be carried across the isthmus, instead of sailing around the end of the island. Mavis Grind carries the main A970 road to Hillswick in the northwest of Shetland and is about two miles (3.2 km) west of the settlement of Brae.

Remains of a late Bronze Age settlement have been found close by.

Notes

References

 

Portages
Isthmuses of Europe
Landforms of Shetland
Former populated places in Scotland
Landforms of Scotland
Mainland, Shetland
Northmavine